Edgar Agostini (1 January 1853 – 7 August 1918) was a Trinidadian cricketer. He played in two first-class matches for Trinidad and Tobago in 1876/77 and 1895/96.

See also
 List of Trinidadian representative cricketers

References

External links
 

1853 births
1918 deaths
Trinidad and Tobago cricketers